The Taliban (or 'seekers'), which also refers to itself by its state name, the Islamic Emirate of Afghanistan, is a Deobandi Islamic fundamentalist and Pashtun nationalist militant political movement in Afghanistan. It ruled approximately three-quarters of the country from 1996 to 2001, before being overthrown following the United States invasion. It recaptured Kabul on 15 August 2021 after nearly 20 years of insurgency, and currently controls all of the country, although its government has not yet been recognized by any country. The Taliban government has been criticized for restricting human rights in Afghanistan, including the right of women and girls to work and to have an education.

The Taliban emerged in September 1994 as one of the prominent factions in the Afghan Civil War and largely consisted of students from the Pashtun areas of eastern and southern Afghanistan who had been educated in traditional Islamic schools. Under the leadership of Mullah Omar, the movement spread throughout most of Afghanistan, shifting power away from the Mujahideen warlords. In 1996, the group administered roughly three-quarters of the country, and established the First Islamic Emirate of Afghanistan. The Taliban's government was opposed by the Northern Alliance militia, which seized parts of northeast Afghanistan and largely maintained international recognition as a continuation of the interim Islamic State of Afghanistan. The Taliban held control of most of the country until being overthrown after the United States invasion of Afghanistan in December 2001. Many members of the Taliban fled to neighboring Pakistan.

After being overthrown, the Taliban launched an insurgency to fight the United States–backed Islamic Republic of Afghanistan and the NATO–led International Security Assistance Force (ISAF) in the War in Afghanistan. In May 2002, exiled members formed the Council of Leaders based in the city of Quetta in Pakistan. They established a political office in Qatar in 2012. Under Hìbatullah Akhundzada's leadership, in May 2021, the Taliban launched a military offensive, that culminated in the Fall of Kabul on 15 August 2021 and the Taliban regaining control of Afghanistan. The Islamic Republic was dissolved and the Islamic Emirate was reestablished.

During their rule from 1996 to 2001, the Taliban enforced a strict interpretation of Sharia, or Islamic law, and were widely condemned for massacres against Afghan civilians, harsh discrimination against religious and ethnic minorities, denial of UN food supplies to starving civilians, destruction of cultural monuments, banning women from school and most employment, and prohibition of most music. Following their return to power in 2021, the Afghanistan government budget lost 80% of its funding and food insecurity became widespread, while all foreign nations refused to recognize the Taliban's regime. The Taliban returned Afghanistan to many policies implemented under its previous rule, including banning women from holding almost any jobs, requiring women to wear head-to-toe coverings such as the burqa, blocking women from travelling without male guardians, and banning all education for girls.

Etymology 
This is a loanword from Arabic , using the Pashto plural ending -ān . (In Arabic  means not 'students' but rather 'two students', as it is a dual form, the Arabic plural being —occasionally causing some confusion to Arabic speakers.) Since becoming a loanword in English, Taliban, besides a plural noun referring to the group, has also been used as a singular noun referring to an individual. For example, John Walker Lindh has been referred to as "an American Taliban", rather than "an American Talib" in domestic media. This is different in Afghanistan, where a member or a supporter of the group is referred to as a Talib (طالب) or its plural Talib-ha (طالبها). In other definitions, Taliban means 'seekers'.

In English, the spelling Taliban has gained predominance over the spelling Taleban. In American English, the definite article is used, the group is referred to as "the Taliban", rather than "Taliban". In English-language media in Pakistan, the definite article is always omitted. Both Pakistani and Indian English-language media tend to name the group "Afghan Taliban", thus distinguishing it from the Pakistani Taliban. Additionally, in Pakistan, the word Talibans is often used when referring to more than one Taliban member.

As per Dari/Persian grammar, there is no "the" prefix.

Background

Soviet intervention in Afghanistan (1978–1992) 

After the Soviet Union intervened and occupied Afghanistan in 1979, Islamic mujahideen fighters waged a war against Soviet forces. During the Soviet–Afghan War, nearly all of the Taliban's original leaders had fought for either the Hezb-i Islami Khalis or the Harakat-i Inqilab-e Islami factions of the Mujahideen.

Pakistan's President Muhammad Zia-ul-Haq feared that the Soviets were also planning to invade Balochistan, Pakistan, so he sent Akhtar Abdur Rahman to Saudi Arabia to garner support for the Afghan resistance against Soviet occupation forces. A while later, the US CIA and the Saudi Arabian General Intelligence Directorate (GID) funnelled funding and equipment through the Pakistani Inter-Service Intelligence Agency (ISI) to the Afghan mujahideen. About 90,000 Afghans, including Mohammed Omar, were trained by Pakistan's ISI during the 1980s.

Afghan Civil War (1992–1996) 

In April 1992, after the fall of the Soviet-backed régime of Mohammad Najibullah, many Afghan political parties agreed on a peace and power-sharing agreement, the Peshawar Accord, which created the Islamic State of Afghanistan and appointed an interim government for a transitional period. Gulbuddin Hekmatyar's Hezb-e Islami Gulbuddin, Hezbe Wahdat, and Ittihad-i Islami did not participate. The state was paralysed from the start, due to rival groups contending for total power over Kabul and Afghanistan.

Hekmatyar's Hezb-e Islami Gulbuddin party refused to recognise the interim government, and in April infiltrated Kabul to take power for itself, thus starting this civil war. In May, Hekmatyar started attacks against government forces and Kabul. Hekmatyar received operational, financial and military support from Pakistan's ISI. With that help, Hekmatyar's forces were able to destroy half of Kabul. Iran assisted the Hezbe Wahdat forces of Abdul Ali Mazari. Saudi Arabia supported the Ittihad-i Islami faction. The conflict between these militias also escalated into war.

Due to this sudden initiation of civil war, working government departments, police units or a system of justice and accountability for the newly created Islamic State of Afghanistan did not have time to form. Atrocities were committed by individuals inside different factions. Ceasefires, negotiated by representatives of the Islamic State's newly appointed Defense Minister Ahmad Shah Massoud, President Sibghatullah Mojaddedi and later President Burhanuddin Rabbani (the interim government), or officials from the International Committee of the Red Cross (ICRC), commonly collapsed within days. The countryside in northern Afghanistan, parts of which were under the control of Defense Minister Massoud, remained calm and some reconstruction took place. The city of Herat under the rule of Islamic State ally Ismail Khan also witnessed relative calm. Meanwhile, southern Afghanistan was neither under the control of foreign-backed militias nor the government in Kabul, but was ruled by local leaders such as Gul Agha Sherzai and their militias.

History

1994 

The Taliban are a movement of religious students (talib) from the Pashtun areas of eastern and southern Afghanistan who were educated in traditional Islamic schools. There were also Tajik and Uzbek students, demarking them from the more ethnic-centric mujahideen groups "which played a key role in the Taliban's rapid growth and success."

Education and motivation 

In September 1994, Mullah Mohammad Omar and 50 students founded the group in his hometown of Kandahar.
Since 1992, Omar had been studying in the Sang-i-Hisar madrassa in Maiwand (northern Kandahar Province). He was unhappy because Islamic law had not been installed in Afghanistan after the ousting of communist rule, and now, he and his group pledged to rid Afghanistan of warlords and criminals. Many of the students, involved in the formation of Taliban, were former commanders in the Afghan-Soviet War.

Within months, 15,000 students in Pakistan, mostly Afghan refugees who were studying in religious schools or madrasas (or as one source calls them Jamiat Ulema-e-Islam-run madrasas) joined the group.

In an effort to aid the anti-Soviet insurgency and inculcate a hatred of foreign invaders in Afghan children, the US government covertly distributed schoolbooks which promoted militant Islamic teachings and included images of weapons and soldiers. The Taliban used the American textbooks but they scratched out the images of human faces which were contained in them in keeping with their strict aniconistic and fundamentalist interpretation of Islam. The United States Agency for International Development gave millions of dollars to the University of Nebraska at Omaha in the 1980s and the university used the money to fund the writing and the publishing of the textbooks in local languages.

The early Taliban were motivated by the suffering of the Afghan people, which they believed was being caused by the power struggles which were being waged by rival Afghan groups which were not adhering to the moral code of Islam; in their religious schools, they had been taught to believe that they should strictly adhere to Islamic law.

Pakistani involvement 

Sources state that Pakistan was heavily involved, already in October 1994, in "creating" of the Taliban. Pakistan's Inter-Services Intelligence agency (ISI), strongly supporting the Taliban in 1994, hoped for a new ruling power in Afghanistan favourable to Pakistan. Even if the Taliban received financial support from Pakistan in 1995 and 1996, and even if "Pakistani support was forthcoming from an early stage of the Taliban movement's existence, the connection was fragile and statements from both the Pakistani ISI as well as the Taliban early on demonstrated the uneasy nature of the relationship. The ISI and Pakistan aimed to exert control, while the Taliban leadership manoeuvred between keeping its independence and sustaining support." The main supporters in Pakistan were General Naseerullah Babar, who mainly thought in terms of geopolitics (opening trade routes to Central Asia), and Maulana Fazl-ur-Rehman of the Jamiat Ulema-e-Islam (F), as "the group represented Deobandism and aimed to counter the influence of the Jama’at-e Islami and growing Wahhabism".

The conquest of Kandahar 
On 3 November 1994, the Taliban, in a surprise attack, conquered Kandahar City. Before 4 January 1995, they controlled 12 Afghan provinces. Militias controlling the different areas often surrendered without a fight. Omar's commanders were a mixture of former small-unit military commanders and madrassa teachers. At these stages, the Taliban were popular because they stamped out corruption, curbed lawlessness, and made the roads and area safe.

1995 – September 1996 

In a bid to establish their rule over all Afghanistan, the Taliban expanded from their Kandahar base sweeping large territories. In early 1995 the movement moved towards Kabul, but they suffered a devastating defeat by government forces of the Islamic State of Afghanistan under the command of Ahmad Shah Massoud. While retreating from Kabul, Taliban fighters started shelling the city, killing many civilians. The media reported in March 1995 that, following the Taliban's shelling, they lost much respect from Afghans and were seen as just another "power-hungry" militia.

After a series of setbacks, the Taliban managed to take control of the western city of Herat on 5 September 1995. Following allegations by the recognised government that Pakistan was aiding the Taliban, a large mob of people attacked the Pakistani embassy in Kabul the day after.

On 26 September 1996, as the Taliban prepared for another major offensive, Massoud ordered a full retreat from Kabul to continue anti-Taliban resistance in the northeastern Hindu Kush mountains instead of engaging in street battles in Kabul. The Taliban entered Kabul on 27 September 1996 and established the Islamic Emirate of Afghanistan. Analysts described the Taliban then as developing into a proxy force for Pakistan's regional interests.

Islamic Emirate of Afghanistan (1996–2001) 

The military goal of the Taliban during the period 1995 to 2001 was to return the order of Abdur Rahman (the Iron Emir) by the re-establishment of a state with Pashtun dominance within the northern areas. The Taliban sought to establish an Islamic government through law and order alongside a strict interpretation of Sharia law, in accordance with the Hanafi school of Islamic jurisprudence and the religious edicts of Mullah Omar, upon the entire land of Afghanistan. By 1998, the Taliban's Emirate controlled 90% of Afghanistan.

In December 2000, the UNSC in Resolution 1333, recognising humanitarian needs of the Afghan people, condemning the use of Taliban territory for training of "terrorists" and Taliban providing safe haven to Osama bin Laden, issued severe sanctions against Afghanistan under Taliban control.
In October 2001, the United States, with allies including the Afghan Northern Alliance, invaded Afghanistan and routed the Taliban régime. The Taliban leadership fled to Pakistan.

Afghanistan during Taliban rule 

When the Taliban took power in 1996, twenty years of continuous warfare had devastated Afghanistan's infrastructure and economy. There was no running water, little electricity, few telephones, functioning roads or regular energy supplies. Basic necessities like water, food, housing and others were in desperately short supply. In addition, the clan and family structure that provided Afghans with a social/economic safety net was also badly damaged. Afghanistan's infant mortality was the highest in the world. A full quarter of all children died before they reached their fifth birthday, a rate several times higher than most other developing countries.

International charitable and/or development organisations (non-governmental organisations or NGOs) were extremely important to the supply of food, employment, reconstruction, and other services, but the Taliban proved highly suspicious towards the 'help' those organisations offered (see § United Nations and NGOs). With over a million deaths throughout the years of war, the number of families headed by widows had reached 98,000 by 1998. In Kabul, where vast portions of the city had been devastated by rocket attacks, more than half of its 1.2 million people benefited in some way from NGO activities, even for drinking water. The civil war and its never-ending refugee stream continued throughout the Taliban's reign. The Mazar, Herat, and Shomali valley offensives displaced more than three-quarters of a million civilians, using "scorched earth" tactics to prevent them from supplying the enemy with aid. The historical Buddhas of Bamiyan were destroyed on Omar Mujahid's orders.

Taliban decision-makers, particularly Mullah Omar, seldom if ever talked directly to non-Muslim foreigners, so aid providers had to deal with intermediaries whose approvals and agreements were often reversed. Around September 1997 the heads of three UN agencies in Kandahar were expelled from the country after protesting when a female attorney for the UN High Commissioner for Refugees was forced to talk from behind a curtain so her face would not be visible.

When the UN increased the number of Muslim women staff to satisfy Taliban demands, the Taliban then required all female Muslim UN staff travelling to Afghanistan to be chaperoned by a mahram or a blood relative. In July 1998, the Taliban closed "all NGO offices" in Kabul by force after those organisations refused to move to a bombed-out former Polytechnic College as ordered. One month later, the UN offices were also shut down. As food prices rose and conditions deteriorated, Planning Minister Qari Din Mohammed explained the Taliban's indifference to the loss of humanitarian aid:

The few organisations active in Kandahar were not subjected to the same demands and continued their operations.

Pakistani military's role during Taliban rule 
The Taliban were largely founded by Pakistan's Inter-Services Intelligence beginning in 1994; the I.S.I. used the Taliban to establish a régime in Afghanistan which would be favourable to Pakistan, as they were trying to gain strategic depth. Since the creation of the Taliban, the ISI and the Pakistani military have given financial, logistical and military support.

According to Pakistani Afghanistan expert Ahmed Rashid, "between 1994 and 1999, an estimated 80,000 to 100,000 Pakistanis trained and fought in Afghanistan" on the side of the Taliban. Peter Tomsen stated that up until 9/11 Pakistani military and ISI officers along with thousands of regular Pakistani armed forces personnel had been involved in the fighting in Afghanistan.

During 2001, according to several international sources, 28,000–30,000 Pakistani nationals, 14,000–15,000 Afghan Taliban and 2,000–3,000 Al-Qaeda militants were fighting against anti-Taliban forces in Afghanistan as a roughly 45,000 strong military force. Pakistani President Pervez Musharraf – then as Chief of Army Staff – was responsible for sending thousands of Pakistanis to fight alongside the Taliban and Bin Laden against the forces of Ahmad Shah Massoud. Of the estimated 28,000 Pakistani nationals fighting in Afghanistan, 8,000 were militants recruited in madrassas filling regular Taliban ranks. The document further states that the parents of those Pakistani nationals "know nothing regarding their child's military involvement with the Taliban until their bodies are brought back to Pakistan". A 1998 document by the US State Department confirms that "20–40 percent of [regular] Taliban soldiers are Pakistani." According to the State Department report and reports by Human Rights Watch, the other Pakistani nationals fighting in Afghanistan were regular Pakistani soldiers, especially from the Frontier Corps but also from the army providing direct combat support.

Human Rights Watch wrote in 2000:

On 1 August 1997, the Taliban launched an attack on Sheberghan, the main military base of Abdul Rashid Dostum. Dostum has said the reason the attack was successful was due to 1500 Pakistani commandos taking part and that the Pakistani air force also gave support.

In 1998, Iran accused Pakistan of sending its air force to bomb Mazar-i-Sharif in support of Taliban forces and directly accused Pakistani troops for "war crimes at Bamiyan". The same year, Russia said Pakistan was responsible for the "military expansion" of the Taliban in northern Afghanistan by sending large numbers of Pakistani troops, some of whom had subsequently been taken as prisoners by the anti-Taliban United Front.

During 2000, the UN Security Council imposed an arms embargo against military support to the Taliban, with UN officials explicitly singling out Pakistan. The UN secretary-general implicitly criticized Pakistan for its military support and the Security Council stated it was "deeply distress[ed] over reports of involvement in the fighting, on the Taliban side, of thousands of non-Afghan nationals". In July 2001, several countries, including the United States, accused Pakistan of being "in violation of U.N. sanctions because of its military aid to the Taliban". The Taliban also obtained financial resources from Pakistan. In 1997 alone, after the capture of Kabul by the Taliban, Pakistan gave $30 million in aid and a further $10 million for government wages.

During 2000, MI6 reported that the ISI was taking an active role in several Al-Qaeda training camps. The ISI helped with the construction of training camps for both the Taliban and Al-Qaeda. From 1996 to 2001 the Al-Qaeda of Osama bin Laden and Ayman al-Zawahiri became a state within the Taliban state. Bin Laden sent Arab and Central Asian Al-Qaeda militants to join the fight against the United Front, among them his Brigade 055.

The role of the Pakistani military has been described by international observers as well as by the anti-Taliban leader Ahmad Shah Massoud as a "creeping invasion".

Anti-Taliban resistance under Massoud 

In late 1996, Ahmad Shah Massoud and Abdul Rashid Dostum, former enemies, created the United Front (Northern Alliance) against the Taliban that were preparing offensives against the remaining areas under the control of Massoud and those under the control of Dostum. The United Front included beside the dominantly Tajik forces of Massoud and the Uzbek forces of Dostum, Hazara troops led by Haji Mohammad Mohaqiq and Pashtun forces under the leadership of commanders such as Abdul Haq and Haji Abdul Qadir. Notable politicians and diplomats of the United Front included Abdul Rahim Ghafoorzai, Abdullah Abdullah and Massoud Khalili. From the Taliban conquest of Kabul in September 1996 until November 2001 the United Front controlled roughly 30% of Afghanistan's population in provinces such as Badakhshan, Kapisa, Takhar and parts of Parwan, Kunar, Nuristan, Laghman, Samangan, Kunduz, Ghōr and Bamyan.

After longstanding battles, especially for the northern city of Mazar-i-Sharif, Abdul Rashid Dostum and his Junbish forces were defeated by the Taliban and their allies in 1998. Dostum subsequently went into exile. Ahmad Shah Massoud remained the only major anti-Taliban leader inside Afghanistan who was able to defend vast parts of his territory against the Taliban.

In the areas under his control Massoud set up democratic institutions and signed the Women's Rights Declaration. In the area of Massoud, women and girls did not have to wear the Afghan burqa. They were allowed to work and to go to school. In at least two known instances, Massoud personally intervened against cases of forced marriage.

Afghan traditions would need a generation or more to overcome and could only be challenged by education, he said. Humayun Tandar, who took part as an Afghan diplomat in the 2001 International Conference on Afghanistan in Bonn, said that "strictures of language, ethnicity, region were [also] stifling for Massoud. That is why ... he wanted to create a unity which could surpass the situation in which we found ourselves and still find ourselves to this day." This applied also to strictures of religion. Jean-José Puig describes how Massoud often led prayers before a meal or at times asked his fellow Muslims to lead the prayer but also did not hesitate to ask a Christian friend Jean-José Puig or the Jewish Princeton University Professor Michael Barry: "Jean-José, we believe in the same God. Please, tell us the prayer before lunch or dinner in your own language."

Human Rights Watch cites no human rights crimes for the forces under direct control of Massoud for the period from October 1996 until the assassination of Massoud in September 2001. 400,000 to one million Afghans fled from the Taliban to the area of Massoud. National Geographic concluded in its documentary Inside the Taliban: "The only thing standing in the way of future Taliban massacres is Ahmad Shah Massoud."

The Taliban repeatedly offered Massoud a position of power to make him stop his resistance. Massoud declined. He explained in one interview:

The United Front in its Proposals for Peace demanded the Taliban to join a political process leading towards nationwide democratic elections. In early 2001, Massoud employed a new strategy of local military pressure and global political appeals. Resentment was increasingly gathering against Taliban rule from the bottom of Afghan society, including the Pashtun areas. Massoud publicised their cause of "popular consensus, general elections and democracy" worldwide. At the same time he was very wary not to revive the failed Kabul government of the early 1990s. Already in 1999, he started the training of police forces which he trained specifically in order to keep order and protect the civilian population in case the United Front would be successful. Massoud stated:

From 1999 onwards, a renewed process was set into motion by the Tajik Ahmad Shah Massoud and the Pashtun Abdul Haq to unite all the ethnicities of Afghanistan. While Massoud united the Tajiks, Hazara and Uzbeks as well as some Pashtun commanders under his United Front command, the famed Pashtun commander Abdul Haq received increasing numbers of defecting Pashtun Taliban as "Taliban popularity trended downward". Both agreed to work together with the exiled Afghan king Zahir Shah. International officials who met with representatives of the new alliance, which Pulitzer Prize winner Steve Coll referred to as the "grand Pashtun-Tajik alliance", said, "It's crazy that you have this today ... Pashtuns, Tajiks, Uzbeks, Hazara ... They were all ready to buy in to the process ... to work under the king's banner for an ethnically balanced Afghanistan." Senior diplomat and Afghanistan expert Peter Tomsen wrote: "The 'Lion of Kabul' [Abdul Haq] and the 'Lion of Panjshir' [Ahmad Shah Massoud] ... Haq, Massoud, and Karzai, Afghanistan's three leading moderates, could transcend the Pashtun–non-Pashtun, north–south divide." The most senior Hazara and Uzbek leader were also part of the process. In late 2000, Massoud officially brought together this new alliance in a meeting in Northern Afghanistan to discuss, among other things, "a Loya Jirga, or a traditional council of elders, to settle political turmoil in Afghanistan". That part of the Pashtun–Tajik–Hazara–Uzbek peace plan did eventually materialise. An account of the meeting by author and journalist Sebastian Junger says: "In 2000, when I was there ... I happened to be there in a very interesting time. ... Massoud brought together Afghan leaders from all ethnic groups. They flew from London, Paris, the USA, all parts of Afghanistan, Pakistan, India. He brought them all into the northern area where he was. He held a council of ... prominent Afghans from all over the world, brought there to discuss the Afghan government after the Taliban. ... we met all these men and interviewed them briefly. One was Hamid Karzai; I did not have any idea who he would end up being".

In early 2001, Ahmad Shah Massoud with ethnic leaders from all of Afghanistan addressed the European Parliament in Brussels asking the international community to provide humanitarian help to the people of Afghanistan. He stated that the Taliban and Al-Qaeda had introduced "a very wrong perception of Islam" and that without the support of Pakistan and Bin Laden the Taliban would not be able to sustain their military campaign for up to a year. On this visit to Europe he also warned that his intelligence had gathered information about a large-scale attack on US soil being imminent. The president of the European Parliament, Nicole Fontaine, called him the "pole of liberty in Afghanistan".

On 9 September 2001, Massoud, then aged 48, was the target of a suicide attack by two Arabs posing as journalists at Khwaja Bahauddin, in the Takhar Province of Afghanistan. Massoud, who had survived countless assassination attempts over a period of 26 years, died in a helicopter taking him to a hospital. The first attempt on Massoud's life had been carried out by Hekmatyar and two Pakistani ISI agents in 1975, when Massoud was only 22 years old. In early 2001, Al-Qaeda would-be assassins were captured by Massoud's forces while trying to enter his territory. The funeral, though in a rather rural area, was attended by hundreds of thousands of mourning people.

The assassination of Massoud is believed to have a connection to the September 11 attacks on US soil, which killed nearly 3000 people, and which appeared to be the terrorist attack that Massoud had warned against in his speech to the European Parliament several months earlier. John P. O'Neill was a counter-terrorism expert and the assistant director of the FBI until late 2001. He retired from the FBI and was offered the position of director of security at the World Trade Center (WTC). He took the job at the WTC two weeks before 9/11. On 10 September 2001, O'Neill told two of his friends, "We're due. And we're due for something big. ... Some things have happened in Afghanistan. [referring to the assassination of Massoud] I don't like the way things are lining up in Afghanistan. ... I sense a shift, and I think things are going to happen ... soon." O'Neill died on 11 September 2001, when the South Tower collapsed.

After 9/11, Massoud's United Front troops and United Front troops of Abdul Rashid Dostum (who returned from exile) ousted the Taliban from power in Kabul with American air support in Operation Enduring Freedom. From October to December 2001, the United Front gained control of much of the country and played a crucial role in establishing the post-Taliban interim government under Hamid Karzai.

Overthrow and another war

Prelude 

On 20 September 2001, US president George W. Bush, speaking to a joint session of Congress, tentatively blamed Al-Qaeda for the 11 September attacks, stating that the "leadership of Al Qaeda ha[d] great influence in Afghanistan and support[ed] the Taliban régime in controlling most of that country". Bush said, "We condemn the Taliban régime", and went on to state, "Tonight the United States of America makes the following demands on the Taliban", which he said were "not open to negotiation or discussion":

 Deliver to the US all of the leaders of Al-Qaeda
 Release all foreign nationals that have been unjustly imprisoned
 Protect foreign journalists, diplomats, and aid workers
 Close immediately every terrorist training camp
 Hand over every terrorist and their supporters to appropriate authorities
 Give the United States full access to terrorist training camps for inspection

The US petitioned the international community to back a military campaign to overthrow the Taliban. The UN issued two resolutions on terrorism after the 11 September attacks. The resolutions called on all states to "[increase] cooperation and full implementation of the relevant international conventions relating to terrorism" and specified consensus recommendations for all countries. According to a research briefing by the House of Commons Library, although the United Nations Security Council (UNSC) did not authorise the US-led military campaign, it was "widely (although not universally) perceived to be a legitimate form of self-defense under the UN Charter", and the council "moved quickly to authorize a military operation to stabilize the country" in the wake of the invasion. Moreover, on 12 September 2001, NATO approved a campaign against Afghanistan as self-defense against armed attack.

The Taliban ambassador to Pakistan, Abdul Salem Zaeef, responded to the ultimatum by demanding "convincing evidence" that Bin Laden was involved in the attacks, stating "our position is that if America has evidence and proof, they should produce it". Additionally, the Taliban insisted that any trial of Bin Laden be held in an Afghan court. Zaeef also claimed that "4,000 Jews working in the Trade Center had prior knowledge of the suicide missions, and 'were absent on that day'." This response was generally dismissed as a delaying tactic, rather than a sincere attempt to cooperate with the ultimatum.

On 22 September, the United Arab Emirates, and later Saudi Arabia, withdrew recognition of the Taliban as Afghanistan's legal government, leaving neighbouring Pakistan as the only remaining country with diplomatic ties. On 4 October, the Taliban agreed to turn bin Laden over to Pakistan for trial in an international tribunal that operated according to Islamic Sharia law, but Pakistan blocked the offer as it was not possible to guarantee his safety. On 7 October, the Taliban ambassador to Pakistan offered to detain bin Laden and try him under Islamic law if the US made a formal request and presented the Taliban with evidence. A Bush administration official, speaking on condition of anonymity, rejected the Taliban offer, and stated that the US would not negotiate their demands.

Coalition invasion 

On 7 October 2001, less than one month after the 11 September attacks, the US, aided by the United Kingdom, Canada, and other countries including several from the NATO alliance, initiated military action, bombing Taliban and Al-Qaeda-related camps. The stated intent of military operations was to remove the Taliban from power, and prevent terrorists from using Afghanistan as a base of operations.

The CIA's elite Special Activities Division (SAD) units were the first US forces to enter Afghanistan (many different countries' intelligence agencies were on the ground or they were already operating within the theatre before the SAD units arrived, because technically, the SAD units are composed of civilian paramilitaries rather than military forces). They joined the Afghan United Front (Northern Alliance) in order to prepare for the subsequent arrival of US Special Operations forces. The United Front (Northern Alliance) and SAD and Special Forces combined to overthrow the Taliban with minimal coalition casualties, and without the use of international conventional ground forces. The Washington Post stated in an editorial by John Lehman in 2006:

On 14 October, the Taliban offered to discuss handing over Osama bin Laden to a neutral country in return for a bombing halt, but only if the Taliban were given evidence of bin Laden's involvement. The US rejected this offer, and continued military operations. Mazar-i-Sharif fell to United Front troops of Ustad Atta Mohammad Noor and Abdul Rashid Dostum on 9 November, triggering a cascade of provinces falling with minimal resistance.

In November 2001, before the capture of Kunduz by United Front troops under the command of Mohammad Daud Daud, thousands of top commanders and regular fighters of the Taliban and Al-Qaeda, Pakistani Inter-Services Intelligence agents and military personnel, and other volunteers and sympathizers in the Kunduz airlift, were evacuated and airlifted out of Kunduz by Pakistan Army cargo aircraft to Pakistan Air Force air bases in Chitral and Gilgit in Pakistan's Northern Areas. This was dubbed the Airlift of Evil by US military forces around Kunduz, and subsequently used as a term in media reports.

On the night of 12 November, the Taliban retreated south from Kabul. On 15 November, they released eight Western aid workers after three months in captivity. By 13 November, the Taliban had withdrawn from both Kabul and Jalalabad. Finally, in early December, the Taliban gave up Kandahar, their last stronghold, dispersing without surrendering.

Targeted killings 

The United States has conducted targeted killings against Taliban leaders, mainly using Special Forces, and sometimes unmanned aerial vehicles. British forces also used similar tactics, mostly in Helmand Province, Afghanistan. During Operation Herrick, British special forces carried out targeted killings against at least fifty high and local Taliban commanders in Helmand Province.

The Taliban have also used targeted killings. In 2011 alone, they killed notable anti-Taliban leaders, such as former Afghan President Burhanuddin Rabbani, the police chief in northern Afghanistan, the commander of the elite anti-Taliban 303 Pamir Corps, Mohammad Daud Daud, and the police chief of Kunduz, Abdul Rahman Saidkhaili. All of them belonged to the Massoud faction of the United Front. According to Guantanamo Bay charge sheets, the United States Department of Defense believes the Taliban may maintain a 40-man undercover unit called "Jihad Kandahar", which is used for undercover operations, including targeted killings.

Resurgence after 2001 

After the attacks of 11 September 2001 on the United States, Pakistan has been accused of continuing to support the Taliban, an allegation Pakistan denies. In mid-2002 exiled Taliban leaders in Pakistan began reconnecting with each other. They formed the Quetta Shura in the Pakistani city of Quetta.

With the fall of Kabul to anti-Taliban forces in November 2001, ISI forces worked with and helped Taliban militias who were in full retreat. In November 2001, Taliban, Al-Qaeda combatants and ISI operatives were evacuated from Kunduz on Pakistan Army cargo aircraft to Pakistan Air Force bases in Pakistan's Northern Areas. Former Pakistani president Pervez Musharraf wrote in his memoirs that Richard Armitage, the former US deputy secretary of state, said Pakistan would be "bombed back to the stone-age" if it continued to support the Taliban, although Armitage has since denied using the "stone age" phrase.

Pashtun tribal chief Hamid Karzai was elected as the national interim leader, and the Taliban had surrendered Kandahar following an offer of amnesty by Karzai. However the US rejected a part of the amnesty in which Taliban leader Mullah Omar could "live in dignity" in his native Kandahar. The Taliban were not invited to the Bonn Agreement of December 2001, which many cite has been the cause of the Taliban's battlefield resurgence and the continuation of conflict. This was partly due to the Taliban's apparent defeat but also a US condition that the Taliban would not be allowed to participate. By 2003 the Taliban showed signs of a comeback and not long afterwards their insurgency was underway. UN negotiator Lakhdar Brahimi admitted in 2006 that not inviting the Taliban to Bonn was "our original sin".

In May and June 2003, high Taliban officials proclaimed the Taliban regrouped and ready for guerrilla war to expel US forces from Afghanistan. In late 2004, the then hidden Taliban leader Mohammed Omar announced an insurgency against "America and its puppets" (i.e. transitional Afghan government forces) to "regain the sovereignty of our country".

On 29 May 2006, while according to American website The Spokesman-Review Afghanistan faced "a mounting threat from armed Taliban fighters in the countryside", a US military truck of a convoy in Kabul lost control and plowed into twelve civilian vehicles, killing one and injuring six people. The surrounding crowd got angry and a riot arose, lasting all day ending with 20 dead and 160 injured. When stone-throwing and gunfire had come from a crowd of some 400 men, the US troops had used their weapons "to defend themselves" while leaving the scene, a US military spokesman said. A correspondent for the Financial Times in Kabul suggested that this was the outbreak of "a ground swell of resentment" and "growing hostility to foreigners" that had been growing and building since 2004, and may also have been triggered by a US air strike a week earlier in southern Afghanistan killing 30 civilians, where she assumed that "the Taliban had been sheltering in civilian houses".

The continued support from tribal and other groups in Pakistan, the drug trade, and the small number of NATO forces, combined with the long history of resistance and isolation, indicated that Taliban forces and leaders were surviving. Suicide attacks and other terrorist methods not used in 2001 became more common. Observers suggested that poppy eradication, which hurt the livelihoods of those Afghans who had resorted to their production, and civilian deaths caused by airstrikes, abetted the resurgence. These observers maintained that policy should focus on "hearts and minds" and on economic reconstruction, which could profit from switching from interdicting to diverting poppy production—to make medicine.

Other commentators viewed Islamabad's shift from war to diplomacy as an effort to appease growing discontent. Because of the Taliban's leadership structure, Mullah Dadullah's assassination in May 2007 did not have a significant effect, other than to damage incipient relations with Pakistan.

Negotiations had long been advocated by then-Afghan President, Hamid Karzai, as well as reportedly the British and Pakistani governments, but resisted by the American government. Karzai offered peace talks with the Taliban in September 2007, but this was swiftly rejected by the insurgent group citing the presence of foreign troops.

On 8 February 2009, US commander of operations in Afghanistan General Stanley McChrystal and other officials said that the Taliban leadership was in Quetta, Pakistan.
By 2009, a strong insurgency had coalesced, known as Operation Al Faath, the Arabic word for "victory" taken from the Koran, in the form of a guerrilla war. The Pashtun tribal group, with over 40 million members (including Afghans and Pakistanis) had a long history of resistance to occupation forces, so the Taliban may have comprised only a part of the insurgency. Most post-invasion Taliban fighters were new recruits, mostly drawn from local madrasas.

In December 2009, Asia Times Online reported that the Taliban had offered to give the US "legal guarantees" that it would not allow Afghanistan to be used for attacks on other countries, and that the US had given no response.

As of July 2016, the US Time magazine estimated 20% of Afghanistan to be under Taliban control with southernmost Helmand Province as their stronghold, while US and international Resolute Support coalition commander General Nicholson in December 2016 likewise stated that 10% was in Taliban hands while another 26% of Afghanistan was contested between the Afghan government and various insurgency groups.

On 7 August 2015, the Taliban killed about 50 people in Kabul. In August 2017, reacting to a hostile speech by US President Trump, a Taliban spokesman retorted that they would keep fighting to free Afghanistan of "American invaders".

In January 2018, a Taliban suicide bomber killed over 100 people in Kabul using a bomb in an ambulance.

By 2020, after the Islamic State of Iraq and the Levant (ISIL) had lost almost all of its conquered territory and committed fewer terrorist acts, the global think tank called the Institute for Economics & Peace considered the Taliban to have overtaken ISIL as the most dangerous terrorist group in the world due to their recent campaigns for territorial expansion.

On 29 May 2020, it was reported that Mullah Omar's son Mullah Yaqoob was now acting as leader of the Taliban after numerous Quetta Shura members were infected with COVID-19. It was previously confirmed on 7 May 2020 that Yaqoob had become head of the Taliban military commission, making him the insurgents' military chief. Among those infected in the Quetta Shura, which continued to hold in-person meetings, were Hibatullah Akhundzada and Sirajuddin Haqqani, then commanders of the Taliban and Haqqani network respectively.

Diplomatic negotiations 
The Taliban's co-founder and then-second-in-command, Abdul Ghani Baradar, was one of the leading Taliban members who favored talks with the US and Afghan governments. Karzai's administration reportedly held talks with Baradar in February 2010; however, later that month, Baradar was captured in a joint US-Pakistani raid in the city of Karachi in Pakistan. The arrest infuriated Karzai and invoked suspicions that he was seized because the Pakistani intelligence community was opposed to Afghan peace talks. Karzai declared after his re-election in the 2009 Afghan presidential election that he would host a "Peace Jirga" in Kabul in an effort for peace. The event, attended by 1,600 delegates, took place in June 2010, however the Taliban and the Hezb-i Islami Gulbuddin, who were both invited by Karzai as a gesture of goodwill did not attend the conference.

A mindset change and strategy occurred within the Obama administration in 2010 to allow possible political negotiations to solve the war. The Taliban themselves had refused to speak to the Afghan government, portraying them as an American "puppet". Sporadic efforts for peace talks between the US and the Taliban occurred afterward, and it was reported in October 2010 that Taliban leadership commanders (the "Quetta Shura") had left their haven in Pakistan and been safely escorted to Kabul by NATO aircraft for talks, with the assurance that NATO staff would not apprehend them. After those talks concluded, it emerged that the leader of this Taliban delegation, who claimed to be Akhtar Mansour, the second-in-command of the Taliban, was actually an imposter who had duped NATO officials.

Karzai confirmed in June 2011 that secret talks were taking place between the US and the Taliban, but these collapsed by January 2012. Further attempts to resume talks were canceled in March 2012, and June 2013 following a dispute between the Afghan government and the Taliban regarding the latter's opening of a political office in Qatar. President Karzai accused the Taliban of portraying themselves as a government in exile. In July 2015, Pakistan hosted the first official peace talks between Taliban representatives and the Afghan government. U.S. and China attended the talks brokered by Pakistan in Murree as two observers. In January 2016, Pakistan hosted a round of four-way talks with Afghan, Chinese and American officials, but the Taliban did not attend. The Taliban did hold informal talks with the Afghan government in 2016.

On 27 February 2018, following an increase in violence, Afghan President Ashraf Ghani proposed unconditional peace talks with the Taliban, offering them recognition as a legal political party and the release of the Taliban prisoners. The offer was the most favorable to the Taliban since the war started. It was preceded by months of national consensus building, which found that Afghans overwhelmingly supported a negotiated end to the war. Two days earlier, the Taliban had called for talks with the US, saying "It must now be established by America and her allies that the Afghan issue cannot be solved militarily. America must henceforth focus on a peaceful strategy for Afghanistan instead of war."

US President Donald Trump twice accused Pakistan of harboring the Taliban and of inaction against terrorists, first in August 2017 then again in January 2018.

Deal with the US 

On 29 February 2020, the US–Taliban deal, officially titled Agreement for Bringing Peace to Afghanistan, was signed in Doha, Qatar. The provisions of the deal included the withdrawal of all American and NATO troops from Afghanistan, a Taliban pledge to prevent al-Qaeda from operating in areas under Taliban control, and talks between the Taliban and the Afghan government.

Despite the peace agreement between the US and the Taliban, insurgent attacks against Afghan security forces were reported to have surged in the country. In the 45 days after the agreement (between 1 March and 15 April 2020), the Taliban conducted more than 4,500 attacks in Afghanistan, which showed an increase of more than 70% as compared to the same period in the previous year. Talks between the Afghan government and the Taliban began in Doha on 12 September 2020. The negotiations were set for March but have been delayed over a prisoner exchange dispute. Mawlavi Abdul Hakim led the initial negotiations for the Taliban. Abdullah Abdullah was one of the leading figures for the Afghan republic's negotiating team. The Afghan government team also comprised women's rights activists.

2021 offensive and return to power 

In mid 2021, the Taliban led a major offensive in Afghanistan during the withdrawal of US troops from the country, which gave them control of over half of Afghanistan's 421 districts as of 23 July 2021.

By mid-August 2021, the Taliban controlled every major city in Afghanistan; following the near seizure of the capital Kabul, the Taliban occupied the Presidential Palace after the incumbent President Ashraf Ghani fled Afghanistan to the United Arab Emirates. Ghani's Asylum was confirmed by the UAE Ministry of Foreign Affairs and International Cooperation on 18 August 2021. Remaining Afghan forces under the leadership of Amrullah Saleh, Ahmad Massoud, and Bismillah Khan Mohammadi retreated to Panjshir to continue resistance.

Islamic Emirate of Afghanistan (2021–) 

The Taliban had "seized power from an established government backed by some of the world's best-equipped militaries"; and as an ideological insurgent movement dedicated to "bringing about a truly Islamic state" its victory has been compared to that of the  Chinese Communist Revolution in 1940s or Iranian Revolution of 1979, with their "sweeping" remake of society. However, as of 2021–2022, senior Taliban leaders  have emphasized the "softness" of their revolution and how they desired "good relations" with the United States, in discussions with American journalist Jon Lee Anderson.

Anderson notes that the Taliban's war against any "graven images", so vigorous in their early rule, has been abandoned, perhaps made impossible by smartphones and Instagram. One local observer (Sayed Hamid Gailani) has argued the Taliban have not killed "a lot" of people after returning to power. Women are seen out on the street, Zabihullah Mujahid (acting Deputy Minister of Information and Culture) noted there are still women working in a number of government ministries, and claimed that girls will be allowed to attend secondary education when bank funds are unfrozen and the government can fund "separate" spaces and transportation for them.

When asked about the slaughter of Hazara Shia by the first Taliban régime, Suhail Shaheen, the Taliban nominee for Ambassador to the U.N. told Anderson "The Hazara Shia for us are also Muslim. We believe we are one, like flowers in a garden." In late 2021, journalists from The New York Times embedded with a six-man Taliban unit tasked with protecting the Shi'ite Sakhi Shrine in Kabul from the Islamic State, noting "how seriously the men appeared to take their assignment." The unit's commander said that "We do not care which ethnic group we serve, our goal is to serve and provide security for Afghans." In response to "international criticism" over lack of diversity, an ethnic Hazara was appointed deputy health minister, and an ethnic Tajik appointed deputy trade minister.

On the other hand, the Ministry of Women's Affairs has been closed and its  building is the new home of Ministry for the Propagation of Virtue and the Prevention of Vice. According to Anderson, some women still employed by the government are "being forced to sign in at their jobs and then go home, to created the illusion of equity"; and the appointment of ethnic minorities has been dismissed by an "adviser to the Taliban" as tokenism.

Reports have "circulated" of
"Hazara farmers being forced from their land by ethnic Pashtuns, of raids of activists' homes, and of extrajudicial executions of former government soldiers and intelligence agents".
According to a Human Rights Watch's report released in November 2021, the Taliban killed or forcibly disappeared more than 100 former members of the Afghan security forces in the three months since the takeover in just the four provinces of Ghazni, Helmand, Kandahar, and Kunduz. According to the report, the Taliban identified targets for arrest and execution through intelligence operations and access to employment records that were left behind. Former members of the security forces were also killed by the Taliban within days of registering with them to receive a letter guaranteeing their safety.

Despite Taliban claims that the ISIS has been defeated, IS carried out suicide bombings in October 2021 at Shia mosques in Kunduz and Kandahar, killing over 115 people. As of late 2021, there were still "sticky bomb" explosions "every few days" in the capital Kabul.

Explanations for the relative moderation of the new Taliban government and statements from its officials such as – “We have started a new page. We do not want to be entangled with the past,”—include that it did not expect to take over the country so quickly and still had "problems to work out among" their factions”;  that $7 billion in Afghan government funds in US banks has been frozen, and that the 80% of the previous government's budget that came from "the United States, its partners, or international lenders", has been shut off, creating  serious economic crisis; according to the U.N. World Food Program country director, Mary Ellen McGroarty, as of late 2021, early 2022 "22.8 million Afghans are already severely food insecure, and seven million of them are one step away from famine"; and that the world community  has "unanimously" asked the Taliban "to form an inclusive government, ensure the rights of women and minorities and guarantee that Afghanistan will no more serve as the launching pad for global terrorist operations", before it recognizes the Taliban government.  In conversation with journalist Anderson, senior Taliban leaders implied that the harsh application of sharia during their first era of rule in the 1990s was necessary because of the "depravity" and "chaos" that remained from the  Soviet occupation, but that now  "mercy and compassion" were the order of the day. This was contradicted by former senior members of the Ministry of Women's Affairs, one of which who told Anderson, "they will do anything to convince the international community to give them financing, but eventually I'll be forced to wear the burqa again. They are just waiting."

On 1 December 2021, clashes erupted between the Taliban and Iran leading to casualties on both sides.

2021–present education policy
In September 2021, the government ordered primary schools to reopen for both sexes and announced plans to reopen secondary schools for male students, without committing to do the same for female students. While the Taliban stated that female college students will be able to resume higher education provided that they are segregated from male students (and professors, when possible), The Guardian noted that "if the high schools do not reopen for girls, the commitments to allow university education would become meaningless once the current cohort of students graduated." Higher Education Minister Abdul Baqi Haqqani said that female university students will be required to observe proper hijab, but did not specify if this required covering the face.

Kabul University reopened in February 2022, with female students attending in the morning and males in the afternoon. Other than the closure of the music department, few changes to the curriculum were reported. Female students were officially required to wear an abaya and a hijab to attend, although some wore a shawl instead. Attendance was reportedly low on the first day.

In March 2022, the Taliban abruptly halted plans to allow girls to resume secondary school education even when separated from males. At the time, The Washington Post reported that apart from university students, "sixth is now the highest grade girls may attend". The Afghan Ministry of Education cited the lack of an acceptable design for female student uniforms.

On December 20, 2022, in violation of their prior promises, the Taliban banned female students from attending higher education institutions with immediate effect. The following day, December 21, 2022, the Taliban instituted a ban on all education for all girls and women around the country alongside a ban on female staff in schools, including teaching professions. Teaching was one of the last few remaining professions open to women.

International recognition 

Following the Taliban's ascension to power, the Islamic Emirate of Afghanistan's model of governance has been widely criticized by the international community, despite the government's repeated calls for international recognition and engagement. Acting Prime Minister Mohammad Hassan Akhund stated that his interim administration has met all conditions required for official recognition. In a bid to gain recognition, the Taliban sent a letter in September 2021 to the UN to accept Suhail Shaheen as Permanent Representative of the Islamic Emirate of Afghanistan – a request that had already been rejected by the UN Credentials Committee in 2021.

On 10 October 2021, Russia hosted the Taliban for talks in Moscow in an effort to boost its influence across Central Asia. Officials from 10 different countries – Russia, China, Pakistan, India, Iran and five formerly Soviet Central Asian states – attended the talks, which were held during the Taliban's first official trip to Europe since their return to power in mid-August 2021. The Taliban won backing from the 10 regional powers for the idea of a United Nations donor conference to help the country stave off economic collapse and a humanitarian catastrophe, calling for the UN to convene such a conference as soon as possible to help rebuild the country. Russian officials also called for action against Islamic State (IS) fighters, who Russia said have started to increase their presence in Afghanistan since the Taliban's takeover. The Taliban delegation, which was led by Deputy Prime Minister Abdul Salam Hanafi, said that "Isolating Afghanistan is in no one's interests," arguing that the extremist group did not pose any security threat to any other country. The Taliban asked the international community to recognize its government, but no country has yet recognized the new Afghan government.

On 23 January 2022, a Taliban delegation arrived in Oslo, and closed-door meetings were held during the Taliban's first official trip to Western Europe and second official trip to Europe since their return to power. Western diplomats told the Taliban that humanitarian aid to Afghanistan would be tied to an improvement in human rights. The Taliban delegation, led by acting Foreign Minister Amir Khan Muttaqi, met senior French foreign ministry officials, Britain's special envoy Nigel Casey, EU Special Representative for Afghanistan and members of the Norwegian foreign ministry. This followed the announcement by the UN Security Council Counter-Terrorism Committee that the committee would extend a travel ban exemption until 21 March 2022 for 14 listed Taliban members to continue attending talks, along with a limited asset-freeze exemption for the financing of exempted travel. However, the Afghan Foreign Minister Amir Khan Muttaqi said that the international community's call for the formation of an inclusive government was a political “excuse" after the 3-day Oslo visit.

At the United Nations Security Council meeting in New York on 26 January 2022, Norwegian Prime Minister Jonas Gahr Store said the Oslo talks appeared to have been “serious” and “genuine”. Norway says the talks do “not represent a legitimisation or recognition of the Taliban”. In the same meeting, the Russian Federation's delegate said attempts to engage the Taliban through coercion are counter-productive, calling on Western states and donors to return frozen funds. China's representative said the fact that aid deliveries have not improved since the adoption of UNSC 2615 (2021) proves that the issue has been politicized, as some parties seek to use assistance as a bargaining chip.

Turkmenistan, the Russian Federation, and China were the first countries to accept the diplomatic credentials of Taliban-appointed envoys, although this is not equivalent to official recognition.

Ideology and aims 
The Taliban's ideology has been described as combining an "innovative" form of Sharia Islamic law which is based on Deobandi fundamentalism and militant Islamism, combined with Pashtun social and cultural norms which are known as Pashtunwali, because most Taliban are Pashtun tribesmen.
The Taliban's ideology has been described as an "innovative form of sharia combining Pashtun tribal codes", or Pashtunwali, with radical Deobandi interpretations of Islam favoured by Jamiat Ulema-e-Islam and its splinter groups. Their ideology was a departure from the Islamism of the anti-Soviet mujahideen rulers and the radical Islamists inspired by the Sayyid Qutb (Ikhwan). The Taliban have said they aim to restore peace and security to Afghanistan, including Western troops leaving, and to enforce Sharia, or Islamic law, once in power.

According to journalist Ahmed Rashid, at least in the first years of their rule, the Taliban adopted Deobandi and Islamist anti-nationalist beliefs, and they opposed "tribal and feudal structures", removing traditional tribal or feudal leaders from leadership roles.

The Taliban strictly enforced their ideology in major cities like Herat, Kabul, and Kandahar. But in rural areas, the Taliban had little direct control, and as a result, they promoted village jirgas, so in rural areas, they did not enforce their ideology as stringently as they enforced it in cities.

Ideological influences 
The Taliban's religious/political philosophy, especially during its first régime from 1996 to 2001, was heavily advised and influenced by Grand Mufti Rashid Ahmed Ludhianvi and his works. Its operating political and religious principles since its founding however was modelled on those of Abul A'la Maududi and the Jamaat-e-Islami movement.

Pashtun cultural influences 
The Taliban, being largely Pashtun tribesmen, frequently follow a pre-Islamic cultural tribal code which is focused on preserving honour. Pashtunwali strongly influences decisions in regards to other social matters. It is best described as subconscious social values and attitudes which promote various qualities such as bravery, preserving honour, being hospitable to all guests, seeking revenge and justice if one has been wronged, and providing sanctuary to anyone who seeks refuge, even if it is an enemy. However, non-Pashtuns and others usually criticize some of the values such as the Pashtun practice of equally dividing inheritances among sons, even though the Qur'an clearly states that women are supposed to receive one-half of a man's share.

According to Ali A. Jalali and Lester Grau, the Taliban "received extensive support from Pashtuns across the country who thought that the movement might restore their national dominance. Even Pashtun intellectuals in the West, who differed with the Taliban on many issues, expressed support for the movement on purely ethnic grounds."

(Deobandi) Islamic rules 

Written works published by the group's Commission of Cultural Affairs including Islami Adalat, De Mujahid Toorah— De Jihad Shari Misalay, and Guidance to the Mujahideen outlined the core of the Taliban Islamic Movement's philosophy regarding jihad, sharia, organization, and conduct. The Taliban régime interpreted the Sharia law in accordance with the Hanafi school of Islamic jurisprudence and the religious edicts of Mullah Omar. The Taliban, Mullah Omar in particular, emphasised dreams as a means of revelation.

Prohibitions 
The Taliban forbade the consumption of pork and alcohol, the use of many types of consumer technology such as music with instrumental accompaniments, television, filming, and the Internet, as well as most forms of art such as paintings or photography, participation in sports, including football and chess; Recreational activities such as kite-flying and the keeping of pigeons and other pets were also forbidden, and the birds were killed according to the Taliban's rules. Movie theatres were closed and repurposed as mosques. The celebration of the Western and Iranian New Years was also forbidden. Taking photographs and displaying pictures and portraits were also forbidden, because the Taliban considered them forms of idolatry. This extended even to "blacking out illustrations on packages of baby soap in shops and painting over road-crossing signs for livestock.

Women were banned from working, girls were forbidden to attend schools or universities, were required to observe purdah (physical separation of the sexes) and awrah (concealing the body with clothing), and to be accompanied by male relatives outside their households; those who violated these restrictions were punished. Men were forbidden to shave their beards and they were also required to let them grow and keep them long according to the Taliban's rules, and they were also required to wear turbans outside their households. Prayer was made compulsory and those men who did not respect the religious obligation after the azaan were arrested. Gambling was banned, and the Taliban punished thieves by amputating their hands or feet. In 2000, the Taliban's leader Mullah Omar officially banned opium cultivation and drug trafficking in Afghanistan; the Taliban succeeded in nearly eradicating the majority of the opium production (99%) by 2001. During the Taliban's governance of Afghanistan, drug users and dealers were both severely persecuted.

Views on the Bamyan Buddhas 

In 1999, Mullah Omar issued a decree in which he called for the protection of the Buddha statues at Bamyan, two 6th-century monumental statues of standing buddhas which were carved into the side of a cliff in the Bamyan valley in the Hazarajat region of central Afghanistan. But in March 2001, the Taliban destroyed the statues, following a decree by Mullah Omar which stated: "all the statues around Afghanistan must be destroyed."

Yahya Massoud, brother of the anti-Taliban and resistance leader Ahmad Shah Massoud, recalls the following incident after the destruction of the Buddha statues at Bamyan:

Views on bacha bazi 

The Afghan custom of bacha bazi, a form of pederastic sexual slavery and pedophilia which is traditionally practiced in various provinces of Afghanistan, was also forbidden under the six-year rule of the Taliban régime. Under the rule of the Islamic Emirate of Afghanistan, bacha bazi, a form of child sexual abuse between older men and young adolescent "dancing boys", has carried the death penalty.

The practice remained illegal during the Islamic Republic of Afghanistan's rule, but the laws were seldom enforced against powerful offenders and police had reportedly been complicit in related crimes. A controversy arose during the Islamic Republic of Afghanistan's rule, after allegations surfaced that US government forces in Afghanistan after the invasion of the country deliberately ignored bacha bazi. The US military responded by claiming the abuse was largely the responsibility of the "local Afghan government". The Taliban has criticized the US role in the abuse of Afghan children.

Relationship with Muslim groups 
Unlike other Islamic fundamentalist organizations, the Taliban are not Salafists. Although wealthy Arab nations had brought Salafist Madrasas to Afghanistan during the Soviet war in the 1980s, the Taliban's strict Deobandi leadership suppressed the Salafi movement in Afghanistan after it first came to power in the 1990s. Following the 2001 US invasion, the Taliban and Salafists joined forces in order to wage a common war against NATO forces, but Salafists were relegated to small groups which were under the Taliban's command.

The Taliban are averse to debating doctrine with other Muslims and "did not allow even Muslim reporters to question [their] edicts or to discuss interpretations of the Qur'an."

Shia Islam 
Afghan Shiites were persecuted during the first Taliban rule. Most Afghan Shiites are members of the Hazara ethnic group, which accounts for almost 10% of Afghanistan's entire population. However, a few Shiite Islamists supported the Taliban rule, such as Ustad Muhammad Akbari. In recent years, the Taliban have attempted to court Shiites, appointing a Shia cleric as a regional governor and recruiting Hazaras to fight against ISIL-KP, in order to distance themselves from their past sectarian reputation and improve their relations with the Shia government of Iran. Following the Taliban's takeover of Afghanistan, reports of the marginalization and persecution of Hazaras and Tajiks began surfacing. On 3 July 2022, in the rural areas around Balkhab District, the Taliban committed a series of attacks against the local Shia Hazara population, including the execution of 150 civilians after long torture, playing music and dancing in Shia Mosques, Shia seminaries, and schools before turning them into military bases, killing Hazaras due to their ethnicity, seizing homes and vehicles belonging to Hazara civilians, causing hundreds of families to flee to the mountains, and not allowing aid workers to reach them - which led to the deaths of three infants.

Relationship with other religious groups 
Along with Shia Muslims, the small Christian community was also persecuted by the Taliban. The Taliban announced in May 2001 that it would force Afghanistan's Hindu population to wear special badges, which has been compared to the treatment of Jews in Nazi Germany. In general, the Taliban treated the Sikhs and Jews of Afghanistan better than Afghan Shiites, Hindus and Christians. During the first period of Taliban rule, only two known Jews were left in Afghanistan, Zablon Simintov and Isaac Levy (c. 1920–2005). Levy relied on charity to survive, while Simintov ran a store selling carpets and jewelry until 2001. They lived on opposite sides of the dilapidated Kabul synagogue. They kept denouncing each other to the authorities, and both spent time in jail for continuously "arguing". The Taliban also confiscated the synagogue's Torah scroll. However, the two men were later released from prison when Taliban officials became annoyed by their arguing.

In January 2005, Levy died of natural causes, leaving Simintov as the sole known Jew in Afghanistan. He cared for the only synagogue in Afghanistan's capital, Kabul. He was still trying to recover the confiscated Torah. Simintov, who does not speak Hebrew, claimed that the man who stole the Torah is now in US custody in Guantanamo Bay. Simintov has a wife and two daughters, all of whom emigrated to Israel in 1998, and he said he was considering joining them. However, when he was asked if he would go to Israel during an interview, Simintov retorted, "Go to Israel? What business do I have there? Why should I leave?" In April 2021, Simintov announced that he would emigrate to Israel after the High Holy Days of 2021, due to the fear that the planned withdrawal of US troops from Afghanistan would result in the Taliban's return to power.

Throughout August 2021, Simintov remained in Kabul, despite having had a chance to escape. Despite initially stating that he would put up with the Taliban for the second time, it has been reported that Simintov emigrated to a presently undisclosed country before the Jewish holiday of Rosh Hashanah on 6 September 2021 after he received death threats from the Taliban or ISIS-KP, taking 30 other refugees with him, including 28 women and children. Ami Magazine, an Orthodox Jewish publication which is based in New York City, reported that Simintov was en route to the United States. Simintov stated that it was not the Taliban but rather the possibility of other, more radical Islamist groups like IS-KP taking him hostage that resulted in his exit from the country. After leaving Afghanistan, Simintov granted his wife a divorce. It was then discovered that an unbeknownst distant cousin of Simintov, Tova Moradi, fled the country sometime in October following Simintov's departure. Contrary to official reports which stated that "no Jewish" person was living in the country, it is believed that Moradi was the last Jew who lived in Afghanistan.

Consistency of the Taliban's ideology 
The Taliban's ideology is not static. Before its capture of Kabul, members of the Taliban talked about stepping aside once a government of "good Muslims" took power and once law and order were restored. The decision-making process of the Taliban in Kandahar was modelled on the Pashtun tribal council (jirga), together with what was believed to be the early Islamic model. Discussion was followed by the building of a consensus by the believers.

As the Taliban's power grew, Mullah Omar made decisions without consulting the jirga or visiting other parts of the country. He visited the capital, Kabul, only twice while he was in power. Taliban spokesman Mullah Wakil explained:

Another sign that the Taliban's ideology was evolving was Mullah Omar's 1999 decree in which he called for the protection of the Buddha statues at Bamyan and the destruction of them in 2001.

Evaluations and criticisms 
The author Ahmed Rashid suggests that the devastation and hardship which resulted from the Soviet invasion and the period which followed it influenced the Taliban's ideology. It is said that the Taliban did not include scholars who were learned in Islamic law and history. The refugee students, brought up in a totally male society, not only had no education in mathematics, science, history or geography, but also had no traditional skills of farming, herding, or handicraft-making, nor even knowledge of their tribal and clan lineages. In such an environment, war meant employment, peace meant unemployment. Dominating women simply affirmed manhood. For their leadership, rigid fundamentalism was a matter not only of principle, but also of political survival. Taliban leaders "repeatedly told" Rashid that "if they gave women greater freedom or a chance to go to school, they would lose the support of their rank and file."

The Taliban have been criticized for their strictness towards those who disobeyed their imposed rules, and Mullah Omar has been criticized for titling himself Amir al-Mu'minin.

Mullah Omar was criticized for calling himself Amir al-Mu'minin on the grounds that he lacked scholarly learning, tribal pedigree, or connections to the Prophet's family. Sanction for the title traditionally required the support of all of the country's ulema, whereas only some 1,200 Pashtun Taliban-supporting Mullahs had declared that Omar was the Amir. According to Ahmed Rashid, "no Afghan had adopted the title since 1834, when King Dost Mohammed Khan assumed the title before he declared jihad against the Sikh kingdom in Peshawar. But Dost Mohammed was fighting foreigners, while Omar had declared jihad against other Afghans."

Another criticism was that the Taliban called their 20% tax on truckloads of opium "zakat", which is traditionally limited to 2.5% of the zakat-payers' disposable income (or wealth).

The Taliban have been compared to the 7th-century Kharijites who developed extreme doctrines which set them apart from both mainstream Sunni and Shiʿa Muslims. The Kharijites were particularly noted for adopting a radical approach to takfir, whereby they declared that other Muslims were unbelievers and deemed them worthy of death.

In particular, the Taliban have been accused of takfir towards Shia. After the August 1998 slaughter of 8,000 mostly Shia Hazara non-combatants in Mazar-i-Sharif, Mullah Niazi, the Taliban commander of the attack and the new governor of Mazar, declared from Mazar's central mosque:
Last year you rebelled against us and killed us. From all your homes you shot at us. Now we are here to deal with you. The Hazaras are not Muslims and now have to kill Hazaras. You either accept to be Muslims or leave Afghanistan. Wherever you go we will catch you. If you go up we will pull you down by your feet; if you hide below, we will pull you up by your hair.Carter Malkasian, in one of the first comprehensive historical works on the Afghan war, argues that the Taliban are oversimplified in most portrayals. While Malkasian thinks that "oppressive" remains the best word to describe them, he points out that the Taliban managed to do what multiple governments and political players failed to: bring order and unity to the "ungovernable land". The Taliban curbed the atrocities and excesses of the Warlord period of the civil war from 19921996. Malkasian further argues that the Taliban's imposing of Islamic ideals upon the Afghan tribal system was innovative and a key reason for their success and durability. Given that traditional sources of authority had been shown to be weak in the long period of civil war, only religion had proved strong in Afghanistan. In a period of 40 years of constant conflict, the traditionalist Islam of the Taliban proved to be far more stable, even if the order they brought was "an impoverished peace".

Condemned practices 
The Taliban have been internationally condemned for their harsh enforcement of their interpretation of Islamic Sharia law, which has resulted in their brutal treatment of many Afghans. During their rule from 1996 to 2001, the Taliban enforced a strict interpretation of Sharia, or Islamic law. The Taliban and their allies committed massacres against Afghan civilians, denied UN food supplies to 160,000 starving civilians, and conducted a policy of scorched earth, burning vast areas of fertile land and destroying tens of thousands of homes. While the Taliban controlled Afghanistan, they banned activities and media including paintings, photography, and movies that depicted people or other living things. They also prohibited music with instrumental accompaniments, with the exception of the daf, a type of frame drum. The Taliban prevented girls and young women from attending school, banned women from working jobs outside of healthcare (male doctors were prohibited from treating women), and required that women be accompanied by a male relative and wear a burqa at all times when in public. If women broke certain rules, they were publicly whipped or executed. The Taliban harshly discriminated against religious and ethnic minorities during their rule and they have also committed a cultural genocide against the people of Afghanistan by destroying numerous monuments, including the famous 1500-year-old Buddhas of Bamiyan. According to the United Nations, the Taliban and their allies were responsible for 76% of Afghan civilian casualties in 2010, and 80% in 2011 and 2012. The group is internally funded by its involvement in the illegal drug trade which it participates in by producing and trafficking in narcotics such as heroin, extortion, and kidnapping for ransom. They also seized control of mining operations in the mid-2010s that were illegal under the previous government.

Massacre campaigns 
According to a 55-page report by the United Nations, the Taliban, while trying to consolidate control over northern and western Afghanistan, committed systematic massacres against civilians. UN officials stated that there had been "15 massacres" between 1996 and 2001. They also said, that "[t]hese have been highly systematic and they all lead back to the [Taliban] Ministry of Defense or to Mullah Omar himself." "These are the same type of war crimes as were committed in Bosnia and should be prosecuted in international courts", one UN official was quoted as saying. The documents also reveal the role of Arab and Pakistani support troops in these killings. Bin Laden's so-called 055 Brigade was responsible for mass-killings of Afghan civilians. The report by the United Nations quotes "eyewitnesses in many villages describing Arab fighters carrying long knives used for slitting throats and skinning people". The Taliban's former ambassador to Pakistan, Mullah Abdul Salam Zaeef, in late 2011 stated that cruel behaviour under and by the Taliban had been "necessary".

In 1998, the United Nations accused the Taliban of denying emergency food by the UN's World Food Programme to 160,000 hungry and starving people "for political and military reasons". The UN said the Taliban were starving people for their military agenda and using humanitarian assistance as a weapon of war.

On 8 August 1998, the Taliban launched an attack on Mazar-i-Sharif. Of 1500 defenders only 100 survived the engagement. Once in control the Taliban began to kill people indiscriminately. At first shooting people in the street, they soon began to target Hazaras. Women were raped, and thousands of people were locked in containers and left to suffocate. This ethnic cleansing left an estimated 5,000 to 6,000 people dead. At this time ten Iranian diplomats and a journalist were killed. Iran assumed the Taliban had murdered them, and mobilised its army, deploying men along the border with Afghanistan. By the middle of September there were 250,000 Iranian personnel stationed on the border. Pakistan mediated and the bodies were returned to Tehran towards the end of the month. The killings of the diplomats had been carried out by Sipah-e-Sahaba, a Pakistani Sunni group with close ties to the ISI. They burned orchards, crops and destroyed irrigation systems, and forced more than 100,000 people from their homes with hundreds of men, women and children still unaccounted for.

In a major effort to retake the Shomali Plains to the north of Kabul from the United Front, the Taliban indiscriminately killed civilians, while uprooting and expelling the population. Among others, Kamal Hossein, a special reporter for the UN, reported on these and other war crimes. In Istalif, a town famous for handmade potteries and which was home to more than 45,000 people, the Taliban gave 24 hours' notice to the population to leave, then completely razed the town leaving the people destitute.

In 1999, the town of Bamian was taken, hundreds of men, women and children were executed. Houses were razed and some were used for forced labour. There was a further massacre at the town of Yakaolang in January 2001. An estimated 300 people were murdered, along with two delegations of Hazara elders who had tried to intercede.

By 1999, the Taliban had forced hundreds of thousands of people from the Shomali Plains and other regions conducting a policy of scorched earth burning homes, farm land and gardens.

Human trafficking 
Several Taliban and al-Qaeda commanders ran a network of human trafficking, abducting ethnic minority women and selling them into sex slavery in Afghanistan and Pakistan. Time magazine writes: "The Taliban often argued that the restrictions they placed on women were actually a way of revering and protecting the opposite sex. The behavior of the Taliban during the six years they expanded their rule in Afghanistan made a mockery of that claim."

The targets for human trafficking were especially women from the Tajik, Uzbek, Hazara and other non-Pashtun ethnic groups in Afghanistan. Some women preferred to commit suicide over slavery, killing themselves. During one Taliban and al-Qaeda offensive in 1999 in the Shomali Plains alone, more than 600 women were kidnapped. Arab and Pakistani al-Qaeda militants, with local Taliban forces, forced them into trucks and buses. Time magazine writes: "The trail of the missing Shomali women leads to Jalalabad, not far from the Pakistan border. There, according to eyewitnesses, the women were penned up inside Sar Shahi camp in the desert. The more desirable among them were selected and taken away. Some were trucked to Peshawar with the apparent complicity of Pakistani border guards. Others were taken to Khost, where bin Laden had several training camps." Officials from relief agencies say, the trail of many of the vanished women leads to Pakistan where they were sold to brothels or into private households to be kept as slaves.

Not all Taliban commanders engaged in human trafficking. Many Taliban were opposed to the human trafficking operations conducted by al-Qaeda and other Taliban commanders. Nuruludah, a Taliban commander, is quoted as saying that in the Shomali Plains, he and 10 of his men freed some women who were being abducted by Pakistani members of al-Qaeda. In Jalalabad, local Taliban commanders freed women that were being held by Arab members of al-Qaeda in a camp.

Oppression of women 

Brutal repression of women was widespread under the Taliban and it received significant international condemnation.  Abuses were myriad and violently enforced by the religious police. For example, the Taliban issued edicts forbidding women from being educated, forcing girls to leave schools and colleges. Women who were leaving their houses were required to be accompanied by a male relative and were obligated to wear the burqa, a traditional dress covering the entire body except for a small slit out of which to see. Those women who were accused of disobedience were publicly beaten. In one instance, a young woman named Sohaila was charged with adultery after she was caught walking with a man who was not a relative; she was publicly flogged in Ghazi Stadium, receiving 100 lashes. Female employment was restricted to the medical sector, where male medical personnel were prohibited from treating women and girls. This extensive ban on the employment of women further resulted in the widespread closure of primary schools, as almost all teachers prior to the Taliban's rise had been women, further restricting access to education not only to girls but also to boys. Restrictions became especially severe after the Taliban took control of the capital. In February 1998, for instance, religious police forced all women off the streets of Kabul and issued new regulations which ordered people to blacken their windows so that women would not be visible from outside.

Violence against civilians 
According to the United Nations, the Taliban and its allies were responsible for 76% of civilian casualties in Afghanistan in 2009, 75% in 2010 and 80% in 2011.

According to Human Rights Watch, the Taliban's bombings and other attacks which have led to civilian casualties "sharply escalated in 2006" when "at least 669 Afghan civilians were killed in at least 350 armed attacks, most of which appear to have been intentionally launched at non-combatants."

The United Nations reported that the number of civilians killed by both the Taliban and pro-government forces in the war rose nearly 50% between 2007 and 2009. The high number of civilians killed by the Taliban is blamed in part on their increasing use of improvised explosive devices (IEDs), "for instance, 16 IEDs have been planted in girls' schools" by the Taliban.

In 2009, Colonel Richard Kemp, formerly Commander of British forces in Afghanistan and the intelligence coordinator for the British government, drew parallels between the tactics and strategy of Hamas in Gaza to those of the Taliban. Kemp wrote:

Discrimination against Hindus and Sikhs 
Hindus and Sikhs have lived in Afghanistan since historic times and they were prominent minorities in Afghanistan, well-established in terms of academics and businesses. After the Afghan Civil War they started to migrate to India and other nations. After the Taliban established the Islamic Emirate of Afghanistan, they imposed strict Sharia laws which discriminated against Hindus and Sikhs and caused the size of Afghanistan's Hindu and Sikh populations to fall at a very rapid rate because they emigrated from Afghanistan and established diasporas in the Western world. The Taliban issued decrees that forbade non-Muslims from building places of worship but allowed them to worship at existing holy sites, forbade non-Muslims from criticizing Muslims, ordered non-Muslims to identify their houses by placing a yellow cloth on their rooftops, forbade non-Muslims from living in the same residence as Muslims, and required that non-Muslim women wear a yellow dress with a special mark so that Muslims could keep their distance from them (Hindus and Sikhs were mainly targeted).

Violence against aid workers and Christians 

On several occasions between 2008 and 2012, the Taliban claimed that they assassinated Western and Afghani medical or aid workers in Afghanistan, because they feared that the polio vaccine would make Muslim children sterile, because they suspected that the 'medical workers' were really spies, or because they suspected that the medical workers were proselytizing Christianity.

In August 2008, three Western women (British, Canadian, US) who were working for the aid group 'International Rescue Committee' were murdered in Kabul. The Taliban claimed that they killed them because they were foreign spies. In October 2008, the British woman Gayle Williams working for Christian UK charity 'SERVE Afghanistan' – focusing on training and education for disabled persons – was murdered near Kabul. Taliban claimed they killed her because her organisation "was preaching Christianity in Afghanistan". In all 2008 until October, 29 aid workers, 5 of whom non-Afghanis, were killed in Afghanistan.

In August 2010, the Taliban claimed that they murdered 10 medical aid workers while they were passing through Badakhshan Province on their way from Kabul to Nuristan Province — but the Afghan Islamic party/militia Hezb-e Islami Gulbuddin has also claimed responsibility for those killings. The victims were six Americans, one Briton, one German and two Afghanis, working for a self-proclaimed "non-profit, Christian organization" which is named 'International Assistance Mission'. The Taliban stated that they murdered them because they were proselytizing Christianity and possessing which were translated into the Dari language when they were encountered. IAM contended that they "were not missionaries".

In December 2012, unidentified gunmen killed four female UN polio-workers in Karachi in Pakistan; the Western news media suggested that there was a connection between the outspokenness of the Taliban and objections to and suspicions of such 'polio vaccinations'. Eventually in 2012, a Pakistani Taliban commander in North Waziristan in Pakistan banned polio vaccinations, and in March 2013, the Afghan government was forced to suspend its vaccination efforts in Nuristan Province because the Taliban was extremely influential in the province. However, in May 2013, the Taliban's leaders changed their stance on polio vaccinations, saying that the vaccine is the only way to prevent polio and they also stated that they will work with immunization volunteers as long as polio workers are "unbiased" and "harmonized with the regional conditions, Islamic values and local cultural traditions."

Restrictions on modern education 
Before the Taliban came to power, education was highly regarded in Afghanistan and Kabul University attracted students from Asia and the Middle East. However, the Taliban imposed restrictions on modern education, banned the education of females, only allowed Islamic religious schools to stay open and only encouraged the teaching of the Qur'an. Around half of all of the schools in Afghanistan were destroyed. The Taliban have carried out brutal attacks on teachers and students and they have also threatened parents and teachers.
As per a 1998 UNICEF report, 9 out of 10 girls and 2 out of 3 boys did not enroll in schools. By 2000, fewer than 4–5% of all Afghan children were being educated at the primary school level and even fewer of them were being educated at higher secondary and university levels.
Attacks on educational institutions, students and teachers and the forced enforcement of Islamic teachings have even continued after the Taliban were deposed from power. In December 2017, United Nations Office for the Coordination of Humanitarian Affairs (OCHA) reported that over 1,000 schools had been destroyed, damaged or occupied and 100 teachers and students had been killed by the Taliban.

Cultural genocide 
The Taliban have committed a cultural genocide against the Afghan people by destroying their historical and cultural texts, artifacts and sculptures.

In the early 1990s, the National Museum of Afghanistan was attacked and looted numerous times, resulting in the loss of 70% of the 100,000 artifacts of Afghan culture and history which were then on display.

On 11 August 1998, the Taliban destroyed the Puli Khumri Public Library. The library contained a collection of over 55,000 books and old manuscripts, one of the most valuable and beautiful collections of Afghanistan's cultural works according to the Afghan people.

On 2 March 2001, the Buddhas of Bamiyan were destroyed with dynamite, on orders from the Taliban's leader Mullah Omar.
In October of the same year, the Taliban "took sledgehammers and axes to thousands of years’ worth of artifacts" in the National Museum of Afghanistan, destroying at least 2,750 ancient works of art.

Afghanistan has a rich musical culture, where music plays an important part in social functions like births and marriages and it has also played a major role in uniting an ethnically diverse country. However, since it came to power and even after it was deposed, the Taliban has banned most music, including cultural folk music, and it has also attacked and killed a number of musicians.

Ban on entertainment and recreational activities 
During their first rule of Afghanistan which lasted from 1996 to 2001, the Taliban banned many recreational activities and games, such as association football, kite flying, and chess. Mediums of entertainment such as televisions, cinemas, music with instrumental accompaniments, VCRs and satellite dishes were also banned. Also included on the list of banned items were "musical instruments and accessories" and all visual representation of living creatures. However, the daf, a type of frame drum, wasn't banned.

It was reported that when Afghan children were caught kiting, a highly popular activity, they were beaten. When Khaled Hosseini learned through a 1999 news report that the Taliban had banned kite flying, a restriction he found particularly cruel, the news "struck a personal chord" for him, as he had grown up with the sport while living in Afghanistan. Hosseini was motivated to write a 25-page short story about two boys who fly kites in Kabul that he later developed into his first novel, The Kite Runner.

Forced conscription and conscription of children 

According to the testimony of Guantanamo captives before their Combatant Status Review Tribunals, the Taliban, in addition to conscripting men to serve as soldiers, also conscripted men to staff its civil service – both done at gunpoint.

According to a report from Oxford University the Taliban made widespread use of the conscription of children in 1997, 1998 and 1999.
The report states that during the civil war that preceded the Taliban régime thousands of orphaned boys joined various militia for "employment, food, shelter, protection and economic opportunity."
The report said that during its initial period the Taliban "long depended upon cohorts of youth". Witnesses stated that each land-owning family had to provide one young man and $500 in expenses. In August of that year 5000 students aged between 15 and 35 left madrassas in Pakistan to join the Taliban.

Leadership and organization 

Kandahar faction and Haqqani network
According to Jon Lee Anderson the Taliban government is "said to be profoundly divided" between the Kandahar faction and the Haqqani network, with a mysterious dispearance of deputy Prime Minister Abdul Ghani Baradar for "several days" in mid-September 2021 explained by rumours of injury after a brawl with other Taliban.  The Kandahar faction is named for the city that Mullah Mohammed Omar came from and where he founded the Taliban, and is described as "insular" and "rural", interested "primarily" with "ruling its home turf". It includes Haibatullah Akhundzada, Mullah Yaqoob, Abdul Ghani Baradar (see below).

The family-based Haqqani network, by contrast are "closely linked to Pakistan's secret services", "interested in global jihad", with its founder (Jalaluddin Haqqani) "connected" the Taliban with Osama bin Laden. It is named for its founder Jalaluddin Haqqani and is currently led by Sirajuddin Haqqani, and includes Khalil Haqqani, Mawlawi Mohammad Salim Saad.
With  Sirajuddin Haqqani as acting interior minister, as of February 2022, the network has control of "a preponderance of security positions in Afghanistan".

Taliban leadership have denied tension between factions. Suhail Shaheen states “there is one Taliban", and Zabihullah Mujahid (acting Deputy Minister of Information and Culture), evenmaintains “there is no Haqqani network.”

Current leadership 
The top members of the Taliban as an insurgency, as of August 2021, are:
Haibatullah Akhundzada, the Taliban's Supreme Leader since 2016, a religious scholar from Kandahar province.
Abdul Ghani Baradar, co-founder of the movement alongside Mohammed Omar, was deputy Prime Minister as of March 2022.  From Uruzgan province, he was imprisoned in Pakistan before his release at the request of the United States.
Mullah Yaqoob, the son of the Taliban's founder Mohammed Omar and leader of the group's military operations.
Sirajuddin Haqqani, leader of the  Haqqani network is acting interior minister as of February 2022, with authority over police and intelligence services. He oversees the group's financial and military assets between the Afghanistan-Pakistan border. The U.S. government has a $10 million bounty for his arrest brought on by several terrorist attacks on hotels and the Indian Embassy.
Sher Mohammad Abbas Stanikzai, former head of the group's political office in Doha. From Logar province, he holds a university master's degree and trained as a cadet at the Indian Military Academy.
Abdul Hakim Ishaqzai, chief negotiatior of the group's political office in Doha, replacing Stanikzai in 2020. Heads the Taliban's powerful council of religious scholars.
Suhail Shaheen, Taliban nominee for Ambassador to the U.N.; former spokesperson of the Taliban's political office in Doha. University educated in Pakistan, he was editor of the English language Kabul Times in the 1990s and served as a deputy ambassador to Pakistan at the time.
Zabihullah Mujahid, the Taliban's spokesperson since 2007. He revealed himself to the public for the first time after the group's capture of Kabul in 2021.

All the top leadership of the Taliban are ethnic Pashtuns, more specifically those belonging of the Ghilzai confederation.

Overview 

Until his death in 2013, Mullah Mohammed Omar was the supreme commander of the Taliban. Mullah Akhtar Mansour was elected as his replacement in 2015, and following Mansour's killing in a May 2016 US drone strike, Mawlawi Hibatullah Akhundzada became the group's leader.

The Taliban initially enjoyed goodwill from Afghans weary of the warlords' corruption, brutality, and incessant fighting.
This popularity was not universal, particularly among non-Pashtuns.

In 2001, the Taliban, de jure, controlled 85% of Afghanistan. De facto the areas under its direct control were mainly Afghanistan's major cities and highways. Tribal khans and warlords had de facto direct control over various small towns, villages, and rural areas.

Rashid described the Taliban government as "a secret society run by Kandaharis ... mysterious, secretive, and dictatorial." They did not hold elections, as their spokesman explained:

They modelled their decision-making process on the Pashtun tribal council (jirga), together with what they believed to be the early Islamic model. Discussion was followed by a building of a consensus by the "believers". Before capturing Kabul, there was talk of stepping aside once a government of "good Muslims" took power, and law and order were restored.

As the Taliban's power grew, decisions were made by Mullah Omar without consulting the jirga and without consulting other parts of the country. He visited the capital, Kabul, only twice while in power. Instead of an election, their leader's legitimacy came from an oath of allegiance ("Bay'ah"), in imitation of the Prophet and the first four Caliphs. On 4 April 1996, Mullah Omar had "the Cloak of the Prophet Mohammed" taken from its shrine for the first time in 60 years. Wrapping himself in the relic, he appeared on the roof of a building in the center of Kandahar while hundreds of Pashtun mullahs below shouted "Amir al-Mu'minin!" (Commander of the Faithful), in a pledge of support. Taliban spokesman Mullah Wakil explained:

The Taliban were very reluctant to share power, and since their ranks were overwhelmingly Pashtun they ruled as overlords over the 60% of Afghans from other ethnic groups. In local government, such as Kabul city council or Herat, Taliban loyalists, not locals, dominated, even when the Pashto-speaking Taliban could not communicate with the roughly half of the population who spoke Dari or other non-Pashtun tongues. Critics complained that this "lack of local representation in urban administration made the Taliban appear as an occupying force."

Organization and governance 
Consistent with the governance of the early Muslims was the absence of state institutions and the absence of "a methodology for command and control", both of which are standard today, even in non-Westernized states. The Taliban did not issue press releases or policy statements, nor did they hold regular press conferences. The basis for this structure was Grand Mufti Rashid Ahmed Ludhianvi’s Obedience to the Amir, as he served as a mentor to the Taliban's leadership. The outside world and most Afghans did not even know what their leaders looked like, because photography was banned. The "regular army" resembled a lashkar or traditional tribal militia force with only 25,000 men (of whom 11,000 were non-Afghans).

Cabinet ministers and deputies were mullahs with a "madrasah education". Several of them, such as the Minister of Health and the Governor of the State bank, were primarily military commanders who left their administrative posts and fought whenever they were needed. Military reverses that trapped them behind enemy lines or led to their deaths increased the chaos in the national administration. At the national level, "all senior Tajik, Uzbek and Hazara bureaucrats" were replaced "with Pashtuns, whether qualified or not". Consequently, the ministries "by and large ceased to function".

The Ministry of Finance did not have a budget nor did it have a "qualified economist or banker". Mullah Omar collected and dispersed cash without bookkeeping.

Economic activities 

The Kabul money markets responded positively during the first weeks of the Taliban occupation (1996). But the Afghani soon fell in value. They imposed a 50% tax on any company operating in the country, and those who failed to pay were attacked. They also imposed a 6% import tax on anything brought into the country, and by 1998 had control of the major airports and border crossings which allowed them to establish a monopoly on all trade. By 2001, the per capita income of the 25 million population was under $200, and the country was close to total economic collapse. As of 2007 the economy had begun to recover, with estimated foreign reserves of three billion dollars and a 13% increase in economic growth.

Under the Transit treaty between Afghanistan and Pakistan a massive network for smuggling developed. It had an estimated turnover of 2.5 billion dollars with the Taliban receiving between $100 and $130 million per year. These operations along with the trade from the Golden Crescent financed the war in Afghanistan and also had the side effect of destroying start up industries in Pakistan. Ahmed Rashid also explained that the Afghan Transit Trade agreed on by Pakistan was "the largest official source of revenue for the Taliban."

Between 1996 and 1999, Mullah Omar reversed his opinions on the drug trade, apparently as it only harmed kafirs. The Taliban controlled 96% of Afghanistan's poppy fields and made opium its largest source of taxation. Taxes on opium exports became one of the mainstays of Taliban income and their war economy. According to Rashid, "drug money funded the weapons, ammunition and fuel for the war." In The New York Times, the Finance Minister of the United Front, Wahidullah Sabawoon, declared the Taliban had no annual budget but that they "appeared to spend US$300 million a year, nearly all of it on war." He added that the Taliban had come to increasingly rely on three sources of money: "poppy, the Pakistanis and bin Laden."

In an economic sense it seems he had little choice, as the war of attrition continued with the Northern Alliance the income from continued opium production was all that prevented the country from starvation. By 2000, Afghanistan accounted for an estimated 75% of the world's supply and in 2000 grew an estimated 3276 tonnes of opium from poppy cultivation on 82,171 hectares. At this juncture Omar passed a decree banning the cultivation of opium, and production dropped to an estimated 74 metric tonnes from poppy cultivation on 1,685 hectares. Many observers say the ban – which came in a bid for international recognition at the United Nations – was only issued in order to raise opium prices and increase profit from the sale of large existing stockpiles. 1999 had yielded a record crop and had been followed by a lower but still large 2000 harvest. The trafficking of accumulated stocks by the Taliban continued in 2000 and 2001. In 2002, the UN mentioned the "existence of significant stocks of opiates accumulated during previous years of bumper harvests." In September 2001 – before the 11 September attacks against the United States – the Taliban allegedly authorised Afghan peasants to sow opium again.

There was also an environmental toll to the country, heavy deforestation from the illegal trade in timber with hundreds of acres of pine and cedar forests in Kunar Province and Paktya being cleared. Throughout the country millions of acres were denuded to supply timber to the Pakistani markets, with no attempt made at reforestation, which has led to significant environmental damage. By 2001, when the Afghan Interim Administration took power the country's infrastructure was in ruins, Telecommunications had failed, the road network was destroyed and Ministry of Finance buildings were in such a state of disrepair some were on the verge of collapse. On 6 July 1999, then president Bill Clinton signed into effect executive order 13129. This order implemented a complete ban on any trade between America and the Taliban régime and on 10 August they froze £5,000,000 in Ariana assets. On 19 December 2000, UN resolution 1333 was passed. It called for all assets to be frozen and for all states to close any offices belonging to the Taliban. This included the offices of Ariana Afghan Airlines. In 1999, the UN had passed resolution 1267 which had banned all international flights by Ariana apart from preapproved humanitarian missions.

According to the lawsuit, filed in December 2019 in the D.C. District Court on behalf of Gold Star families, some US defense contractors involved in Afghanistan made illegal "protection payments" to the Taliban, funding a "Taliban-led terrorist insurgency" that killed or wounded thousands of Americans in Afghanistan. In 2009, then-Secretary of State Hillary Clinton said that the "protection money" was "one of the major sources of funding for the Taliban."

It is estimated that in 2020 the Taliban had an income of $1.6 billion, mostly from drugs, mining, extortion and taxes, donations and exports.

On 2 November 2021, the Taliban required that all economic transactions in Afghanistan use Afghanis and banned the use of all foreign currency.

International relations 

The Taliban are supported by several militant outfits which include the Haqqani network, Al-Qaeda and the Islamic Movement of Uzbekistan. Several countries like China, Iran, Pakistan, Qatar, Russia and Saudi Arabia allegedly support the Taliban. However, all of their governments deny providing any support to the Taliban. Likewise, the Taliban also deny receiving any foreign support from any country. At its peak, formal diplomatic recognition of the Taliban's government was acknowledged by three nations: Pakistan, Saudi Arabia, and the United Arab Emirates. In the past, the United Arab Emirates and Turkmenistan were also alleged to have provided support to the Taliban. It is designated by some countries as a terrorist organization.

During its time in power (1996–2001), at its height ruling 90% of Afghanistan, the Taliban régime, or "Islamic Emirate of Afghanistan", gained diplomatic recognition from only three states: the United Arab Emirates, Pakistan, and Saudi Arabia, all of which provided substantial aid. The most other nations and organizations, including the United Nations, recognised the government of the Islamic State of Afghanistan (1992–2002) (parts of whom were part of the United Front, also called Northern Alliance) as the legitimate government of Afghanistan. Regarding its relations with the rest of the world, the Taliban's Emirate of Afghanistan held a policy of isolationism: "The Taliban believe in non-interference in the affairs of other countries and similarly desire no outside interference in their country's internal affairs".

Traditionally, the Taliban were supported by Pakistan and Saudi Arabia, while Iran, Russia, Turkey, India, Uzbekistan, Kazakhstan, Kyrgyzstan, and Tajikistan formed an anti-Taliban alliance and supported the Northern Alliance. After the fall of the Taliban régime at the end of 2001, the composition of the Taliban supporters changed. According to a study by scholar Antonio Giustozzi, in the years 2005 to 2015 most of the financial support came from the states Pakistan, Saudi Arabia, Iran, China, and Qatar, as well as from private donors from Saudi Arabia, from al-Qaeda and, for a short period of time, from the Islamic State. About 54 percent of the funding came from foreign governments, 10 percent from private donors from abroad, and 16 percent from al-Qaeda and the Islamic State. In 2014, the amount of external support was close to $900 million.

Designation as a terrorist organization 

Officially, the Taliban is an illegal organization in several countries in 2022:

Former:  (2002–2015), but never on the United States Department of State list of Foreign Terrorist Organizations.

United Nations and NGOs 
Despite the aid of United Nations (UN) and non-governmental organisations (NGOs) given (see § Afghanistan during Taliban rule), the Taliban's attitude in 1996–2001 toward the UN and NGOs was often one of suspicion. The UN did not recognise the Taliban as the legitimate government of Afghanistan, most foreign donors and aid workers were non-Muslims, and the Taliban vented fundamental objections to the sort of 'help' the UN offered. As the Taliban's Attorney General Maulvi Jalil-ullah Maulvizada put it in 1997:

In July 1998, the Taliban closed "all NGO offices" by force after those organisations refused to move to a bombed-out former Polytechnic College as ordered. One month later the UN offices were also shut down.

Around 2000, the UN drew up sanctions against officials and leaders of Taliban, because of their harbouring Osama bin Laden. Several of the Taliban leaders have subsequently been killed.

In 2009, British Foreign Secretary Ed Miliband and US Secretary Hillary Clinton called for talks with 'regular Taliban fighters' while bypassing their top leaders who supposedly were 'committed to global jihad'. Kai Eide, the top UN official in Afghanistan, called for talks with Taliban at the highest level, suggesting Mullah Omar—even though Omar dismissed such overtures as long as foreign troops were in Afghanistan.

In 2010, the UN lifted sanctions on the Taliban, and requested that Taliban leaders and others be removed from terrorism watch lists. In 2010 the US and Europe announced support for President Karzai's latest attempt to negotiate peace with the Taliban.

In popular media

The Taliban were portrayed in Khaled Hosseini's popular 2003 novel The Kite Runner and its 2007 film adaption. The Taliban have also been portrayed in American film, most notably in Lone Survivor (2013) which is based on a real-life story. Hindi cinema have also portrayed the Taliban in Kabul Express (2006), and Escape from Taliban (2003) which is based on a real-life novel A Kabuliwala's Bengali Wife, whose author Sushmita Banerjee was shot dead by the Taliban in 2013.

Notes

References

Bibliography

Further reading 
 
 
 One Year of Taliban Rule Over Afghanistan
 "Afghan Women and the Taliban: An Exploratory Assessment" (International Centre for Counter-Terrorism – The Hague 2014)

External links 

Anti-Buddhism
Anti-Christian sentiment in Asia
Anti-Hindu sentiment
Anti-ISIL factions
Anti-LGBT sentiment
Anti-Shi'ism
Axis of Resistance
Antisemitism in Asia
Anti-Zionism in Asia
Deobandi organisations
Far-right politics in Afghanistan
Government of Afghanistan
Groups affiliated with al-Qaeda
Islam-related controversies
Jihadist groups in Afghanistan
Jihadist groups in Pakistan
Violence against LGBT people
Organizations designated as terrorist by Canada
Organizations designated as terrorist by Kyrgyzstan
Organizations designated as terrorist by Russia
Organizations designated as terrorist by Kazakhstan
Organizations designated as terrorist by Tajikistan
Organizations designated as terrorist by the United Arab Emirates
Organizations that oppose LGBT rights
Rebel groups that actively control territory
Sexism in Afghanistan
Sunni Islamist groups
Supraorganizations
 
Totalitarianism
Theocracies
1994 establishments in Afghanistan